Unended Quest: An Intellectual Autobiography is a 1976 book by the philosopher Karl Popper.

The work first appeared with the title  "Autobiography of Karl Popper" in The Philosophy of Karl Popper (1974) from the Library of Living Philosophers series.

The book chronicles Popper's life from the beginning, including wider implications he drew from his experiences. In chapter 1, "Omniscience and Fallibility,"  for example, he describes his apprenticeship to a cabinetmaker while he was a university student. His master invited him to ask anything he liked, because, with due modesty, the master claimed to know everything. Popper writes that he became a disciple of Socrates and learned more about the theory of knowledge, including how little he knew, from his 'omniscient master' than from his university teachers.
Other thematic chapter subjects include music, education, philosophical problems Popper encountered, and his differences from other philosophers, whether earlier or contemporary.  These are woven into an account of events in his life and research programmes that he developed. For example, Chapter 24 discusses 2 of his best-known works, The Open Society and Its Enemies and The Poverty of Historicism, and the origins of 'critical rationalism' to describe the approach he espoused.

Notes

References
 Karl R. Popper (1976 [2002]). Unended Quest: An Intellectual Autobiography. Description  & Contents. London and New York: Routledge 
 _, (1994). The Myth of the Framework: In Defence of Science and Rationality.
 John Watkins (1997).  "Karl Raimund Popper, 1902-1994," Proceedings of the British Academy, 94, pp. 645-85, which makes heavy use of Unended Quest  besides many other sources. 
 Bryan Magee (1973). Popper,  Contents. Psychology Press. A popular account.  
 John Vernon (2011). "Unended  Quest By Karl Popper".  A blog that suggests by examples how Popper's major ideas can readily be understood through the book.

1976 non-fiction books
American non-fiction books
Analytic philosophy literature
German autobiographies
Books about liberalism
Books by Karl Popper
English-language books
Philosophy of science literature
Political philosophy literature